Methylenedioxybutylamphetamine (MDBU or 3,4-methylenedioxy-N-butylamphetamine) is a lesser-known psychedelic drug. It is also the N-butyl derivative of 3,4-methylenedioxyamphetamine (MDA). MDBU was first synthesized by Alexander Shulgin. In his book PiHKAL, the minimum dosage is listed as 40 mg, and the duration unknown. MDBU produces few to no effects.  Very little data exists about the pharmacological properties, metabolism, and toxicity of MDBU.

See also 

 Phenethylamine
 Psychedelics, dissociatives and deliriants
 MDA

References 

Substituted amphetamines
Benzodioxoles